The BL 7.5-inch Mk II–Mk V guns were a variety of 50-calibre naval guns used by Britain in World War I. They all had similar performance and fired the same shells.

History

Mark II 
Mark II guns were originally developed to suit India's coastal defence requirements. During World War I several reserve guns made for India but still in the UK were employed as coastal defence guns in the UK. They were scrapped or sent to India soon after the war.

Marks II*, II**, V 

These were built and employed specifically as naval guns and were mounted as secondary armament as a heavier alternative to 6-inch guns, on the following ships :
 Warrior-class armoured cruisers laid down 1903–04, commissioned 1906–07
 Minotaur-class armoured cruisers laid down 1905, commissioned 1908–09

Mark III 

Mark III guns were built by Elswick Ordnance to arm the battleship Constitución they were building for Chile. Britain acquired them by default when she bought Constitución in 1903 to avoid the risk of the ship being acquired by Russia. Constitución became HMS Swiftsure in British service.

Swiftsure was decommissioned in 1917 and her guns were used for coast defence in Britain, as siege guns on the Belgian coast near Nieuport for attacking German batteries, and on M15-class monitors.

Mark IV 
Mark IV guns were made by Vickers for the battleship Libertad they were building for Chile. Britain acquired them by default in 1903 when she bought Libertad together with Constitución. Libertad became  in British service.

Surviving examples 

 Two Mk II coast-defence guns made by EOC in 1905 and RGF in 1906, on Elephanta Island, Mumbai, India. Photographs on Flickr

See also 
 List of naval guns

Notes

References

Bibliography 
 Hogg, I.V. and Thurston, L.F. (1972). British Artillery Weapons & Ammunition 1914–1918. Ian Allan, London.
 Tony DiGiulian, British 7.5"/50 (19 cm) Mark III 7.5"/50 (19 cm) Mark IV
 Tony DiGiulian, British 7.5"/50 (19 cm) Mark II 7.5"/50 (19 cm) Mark V

External links 

Naval guns of the United Kingdom
World War I naval weapons of the United Kingdom
190 mm artillery